Bronislovas is a Lithuanian masculine given name. Notable people with the name include:

Bronislovas Lubys (1938–2011), Lithuanian entrepreneur, former Prime Minister of Lithuania  
Bronislovas Genzelis (born 1934), Lithuanian politician
Bronislovas Rudys (born 1954), Lithuanian image and installation art artist.

Lithuanian masculine given names